Yazidi literature is literature produced by the Yazidi people. Although Yazidi literature has traditionally been primarily oral, many Yazidi texts have been transcribed since the 1970s. Kurmanji is the main language used.

Unlike the other major religions of the Near East, Yazidism does not have a standardized canon of religious texts, since religious knowledge is traditionally transmitted orally.

Some of the largest text collections of Yazidi literature have been compiled by Philip G. Kreyenbroek (2005) and Khanna Omarkhali (2017). Other compilations of various Yazidi texts are those of Christine Allison (2001) and Teimuraz Avdoev, a Georgian Yazidi.

List of texts
This section contains a comprehensive list of Yazidi oral religious texts as compiled by Omarkhali (2017).

Yazidi oral religious poetry can be categorized into the following categories.

Poetic
Qewl: considered to be of divine origin. The most important qewls are the Berane Qewls ("rams' qewls"), with just over a dozen of qewls typically considered as belonging to this category.
Beyt: highly respected, but not considered to be of divine origin like the qewls
Duʿa: prayers
Qesîde: considered to have been composed by the disciples of Sheikh Adi
Semaʿ
Lavij
Xizêmok (song of the "nose ring")
Payîzok (song of "autumn")
Robarîn (song of the "rivers")
Xerîbo

Prose
Mishabet ("sermon")
Çîrok û Çîvanok ("narrative")
Dastan ("tale")

Qewl

Qewlê Afrîna Dinyanê (Qewlê Afirandina Dinyayê, Qewlê Kinyatê) – The Hymn of the Creation of the World. One of the Berane Qewls.
Qewlê Aqûb û Mûsa
Qewlê Asasê – The Hymn of the Basis
Qewlê Aşê Muhbetê – The Hymn of the Mill of Love. Attributed to Pîr Reşê Heyran.
Qewlê Axiretê (Qewlê Sibêyek ji yêt ʿEdewiye, Qewlê Nefs û Aqil) – The Hymn of the Judgement Day
Qewlê Axiretê – The Hymn of the Judgement Day. Has its own melody.
Qewlê Bav Bekirê Omera – The Hymn of Bav Bekirê Omera. Attributed to Babekrê Omera yê Zerzayî. Has its own melody.
Qewlê Baza
Qewlê Bedir û Mend – The Hymn of Bedir and Mend. Has its own melody.
Qewlê Bedîla Sineʿt Kamil
Qewlê Bedîla Xedara (Qewlê Du Şax) – The Hymn of the Cruel Epoch. Sometimes considered to be one of the Berane Qewls.
Qewlê Behra (Qewlê Beʿra) – The Hymn of the Ocean. Usually recited during pilgrimages (ziyaret), and sometimes also during funerals.
Qewlê Beʿra – The Hymn of the Ocean. Has its own melody.
Qewlê Beygoya (Qewlê Bêgoya) – The Hymn of the False Accuser. Attributed to Sheikh Fexir or Derwêş Qatan
Qewlê Bêgoya – The Hymn of the False Accuser
Qewlê Bê û Elîf – The Hymn of B and A. One of the Berane Qewls.
Qewlê Birahîmê kurê Mihemmed
Qewlê Birahîm Xelîl
Qewlê Bore-borê
Qewlê Borêt Feqîra – The Hymn of the Horses of the Feqîrs. Attributed to Sheikh Mend.
Qewlê Cêma Cimleta (Qewlê Civat û Cimlete) – The Hymn of the Gathering of the Community
Qewlê Cimcimî Siltan – The Hymn of the Skull of the King
Qewlê Cirgîn
Qewlê Civatê – The Hymn of the Community. Attributed to Pîr Reşê Heyran.
Qewlê Çakê Me li Ser de – The Hymn of our Goodness with it. Attributed to Pîr Reşê Heyran.
Qewlê Çarşema Sor (Beyta Çarşemê, Qewlê Çarşembûyê) – The Hymn of the Red Wednesday. Attributed to Sheikh Fexir. Has its own melody. Recited when starting fires at sacred sites in the Lalish valley before the New Year Feast in April.
Qewlê Çî Sibeyeke Tarî Ye – The Hymn of What a Dark Morning It Is
Qewlê Daîk û Baba (Qewlê Day û Baba) – The Hymn of the Parents. Attributed to Sheikh Fexir. Sometimes considered to be one of the Berane Qewls.
Qewlê Denûn Misrî – The Hymn of Dhu-Nun from Egypt. Has its own melody (same as Qewlê Derwêş Adam).
Qewlê Dewrêşa
Qewlê Derwêş Adem (Qewlê Derwêş Adem û Mîr Brahîm) – The Hymn of Derwêş Adam. Has its own melody (same as Qewlê Denûn Misrî).
Qewlê Dewrêş Hebîb – The Hymn of Derwêş Hebib. Has its own melody.
Qewlê di ʿEmrekî da Mame – The Hymn I Remained in a Life
Qewlê Diol û Aqil
Qewlê Distrême
Qewlê Dota Qadiyê Besrayê (Qewlê Dota Qaziyê Besrayê)
Qewlê Dota Qaziyê Besrayê
Qewlê Dura
Qewlê Du Şax
Qewlê ʿErd û ʿEzman – The Hymn of Earth and Sky. One of the Berane Qewls.
Qewlê Erkanê
Qewlê Êzdîdê Mezin (Qewlê Ser Behrê) – The Hymn of a Great Êzîd
Qewlê Êzdînê Mîr (Qewlê Sê Kasanî Mest im) – The Hymn of Êzdînê Mîr. Has its own melody.
Qewlê Êzîd (Qewlê Êzdîd, Qewlê Makê, Qewlê Mezin) – The Hymn of Êzîd. Attributed to Pisê Cem. Has 3 melodies. Often considered to be the longest Yazidi hymn. Recited during the Tawûs gêran ("touring of Tawus").
Qewlê Êzîd û Medehê (Qewlê Ji Sultan Êzdî Didim Medehê) – The Hymn of Êzîd and Praising. Has its own melody.
Qewlê ʿEzmer Feqîn
Qewlê Firwara Melik Şêx Sin – The Hymn of the Order of the Angel Sheikh Sin (Şêxisin). Has its own melody.
Qewlê Firwara Mûsa (Qewlê Mûsa, Qewlê Nebî Mûsa)
Qewlê Firwara Şêx Fexir – The Hymn of the Order. Attributed to Sheikh Fexir. Has its own melody. Recited at funerals.
Qewlê Firwarê (Qewlê Firwara Şêx Fexir, Qewlê Melek Fexredîn) – The Hymn of the Order
Qewlê Gay û Masî – The Hymn of the Fish and Bull. One of the Berane Qewls.
Qewlê Gelya Marî
Qewlê Gêla Çar Ziman – The Hymn of the Lad of four languages. Attributed to Sheikh Fexir. Has its own melody.
Qewlê Gêla Şêx Mend – The Hymn of the Lad Sheikh Mend
Qewlê Hemedê Babê
Qewlê Herê Berê Ko Bû – The Hymn of Where was [the King] at First? Sometimes considered to be one of the Berane Qewls.
Qewlê Hesedê Al-Tewrî – The Hymn of Hesedê el-Tewrî. Attributed to Hesedê el-Tewrî.
Qewlê Hesenê Celê (Hesenê Çelê) – The Hymn of Hesenê Çelê. Has its own melody.
Qewlê Hevsarî (Qewlê Hefsarî) – The Hymn of the Bridle
Qewlê Hey Canê (a part of Qewlê Makê)
Qewlê Hezar û Yek Nav (Qewlê Hezar û Êk Nav) – The Hymn of the Thousand and One Names. Attributed to Sheikh Fexir.
Qewlê Hindav de Çûme Banî – The Hymn of I Rose to the Top
Qewlê Husêyînî Helac (Qewlê Helacê Mensûr, Qewlê Hisênê Helac) – The Hymn of the Hussein Hallaj. Has its own melody.
Qewlê Îmanê (Qewlê Îmanê Bi Çi Nîşane, Qewlê Nasridîn) – The Hymn of the Belief. Attributed to Sheikh Fexir. Has its own melody (same as Qewlê Xudanê Malê).
Qewlê Ji Şamê Têm Meclisê – The Hymn of from Syria/Damascus I Come to the Gathering. Attributed to Sheikh Fexir.
Qewlê Kasa
Qewlê Keniya Mara (Şîxadî Şêxê Şara) – The Hymn of the Laughter of Snakes
Qewlê Koçeka – The Hymn of Koçeks. Has its own melody.
Qewlê Kofa (Qewlê Pîrê Libnana, Qewlê Dilê Min î bi Kovan e) – The Hymn of the Headdress. Attributed to Dawidî bin Derman. Has its own melody (2 melodies).
Qewlê Lawê Pîran (Qewlê Lawikê Pîran) – The Hymn of Lawikê Pîran. Attributed to Lawikê Pîr. Has its own melody. One of the Berane Qewls.
Qewlê li Ser Tofanê – The Hymn on the Storm. Attributed to Sheikh Fexir.
Qewlê Makê
Qewlê Mala Bava (Qewlê Hoş Malê Bava, Qewlê Disitrême) – The Hymn of the Home of Father. Has its own melody.
Qewlê Mal û Mêra (Qewlê Hey Mal û Mêran)
Qewlê Meha(n) (Qewlê Mehên Salê) – The Hymn of the Months. Attributed to Sheikh Fexir. Has its own melody (same as Qewlê Çarşema).
Qewlê Mela Ebû Bekir – The Hymn of Mela Ebu Bekir
Qewlê Melek Ferxedîn
Qewlê Melek Salim
Qewlê Melek Şêx Sin – The Hymn of Angel Sheikh Sin
Qewlê Mersûma Barî
Qewlê Mest im ji Qedehê
Qewlê Mezin – The Great Hymn. One of the Berane Qewls.
Qewlê Mewlê Me (Qewlê Kasa) – The Hymn of I am a Teacher
Qewlê Mirîdê (Qewlê Mirîdiyê) – The Hymn of Mirîds. Attributed to Pîr Reşê Heyran. Has its own melody.
Qewlê Miskîno Jaro – The Hymn of the Weak Miserable One. Has its own melody.
Qewlê Miskîn Tajdîn – The Hymn of Miskîn Tajdîn. Attributed to Sheikh Fexir. Has its own melody.
Qewlê Mişetê – The Hymn of Mişhet. Attributed to Sheikh Fexir. Has its own melody.
Qewlê Miştaqê Sê Bor im – The Hymn of I Crave for Three Steeds. Attributed to Hesedê el-Tewrî.
Qewlê Mizgîna Mêra – The Hymn of Good News
Qewlê Mizgîniyê (Qewlê Mizgîna Mêra, Qewlê Stiya Ês) – The Hymn of Good News. Attributed to Pîr Reşê Heyran.
Qewlê Mîr Birahîm (Qewlê Birahîm Xelîl) – The Hymn of Mîr Ibrahim. Has its own melody.
Qewlê Muhra Mêra
Qewlê Mûsa Pêxember – The Hymn of the Prophet Moses. Attributed to Sheikh Hevind.
Qewlê Mûsa Pêxember û Xidirê Zênde
Qewlê Nadir – The Hymn of the Rare [Knowledge]
Qewlê Nebî Mihemed
Qewlê Nebî Simayîl – The Hymn of the Prophet Ishmael. Sometimes attributed to Pîr Xidir. Has its own melody.
Qewlê Nefsê
Qewlê Nefs û Aqil
Qewlê Newrozê
Qewlê Nuh Pêxember
Qewlê Omer Xale û Hesin Çinêrî – The Hymn of Omer Xala and Hesin Çinêrî. Attributed to Sheikh Fexir or Dawidî bin Derman. Has its own melody.
Qewlê Pedşayî (Qewlê Padişayî) – The Hymn of the Lord. Attributed to Sheikh Fexir.
Qewlê Pişt Perde (lit. the hymn of "beyond the veil")
Qewlê Pîr Dawud – The Hymn of Pîr Dawud. Attributed to Pîr Dawud. Has its own melody (same as Qewlê Pîr Şeref).
Qewlê Pîrê Siba
Qewlê Pîr Hemedê Boz – The Hymn of Pîr Hemedê Boz
Qewlê Pîr Mehmedê Kurdî – The Hymn of Pîr Mehmedê Kurdî
Qewlê Pîr Reşê Heyran (Qewlê Pîr Reşîdê Heyran) – The Hymn of Pîr Reşê Heyran. Attributed to Pîr Reşê Heyran.
Qewlê Pîr Şeref (Beyta Beʿza, Beyta Baza) – The Hymn of Pîr Şeref. Attributed to Dawidî bin Derman. Has its own melody (same as Qewlê Pîr Dawud).
Qewlê Qazî Esker
Qewlê Qazî Şiro
Qewlê Qedîlbilban – The Hymn of Qedîlbilban
Qewlê Qendîla (Qewlê Zênare) – The Hymn of [the source of] the Lights. Attributed to Pîr Reşê Heyran or Sheikh Fexir. Has its own melody.
Qewlê Qere Firqan – The Hymn of the Black Firqan. Attributed to Sheikh Fexir. One of the Berane Qewls.
Qewlê Qiyametê 1 – The Hymn of the End of the World. Has its own melody.
Qewlê Qiyametê 2 – The Hymn of the End of the World. Has its own melody.
Qewlê Rabiʿe il-ʿEdewiye – The Hymn of Rabʿa al-ʿAdawiyya’. Has its own melody.
Qewlê Rojekê Ez Sefer Bûm – The Hymn of One Day I Made a Journey. Attributed to Sheikh Fexir.
Qewlê Sera Mergê (Qewlê Seremergê) – The Hymn of the Moment of Death. Has its own melody. Often recited at funerals. One of the Berane Qewls.
Qewlê Sê Kasa Mest im
Qewlê Sibekê ji yêt ʿEdewiya
Qewlê Silavêt Melik Fexredîn – The Hymn of the Greetings of the Angel Fexredin. Attributed to Sheikh Fexir.
Qewlê Silavêt Mel(e)kê Kerîm – The Hymn of the Great Angel (i.e., God). Attributed to Pîr Xidir.
Qewlê Silav Silavêt Cebêra – The Hymn of the Greetings is the Greetings of the Mighty Ones. Attributed to Dawidî bin Derman.
Qewlê Silav û Sed Silav (Qewlê Şêxisin û Şêx Fexir) – The Hymn of Greeting and a Hundred Greetings. Attributed to Sheikh Fexir. Has its own melody.
Qewlê Simaîl Pêxember (Qewlê Nebî Simaîl) – The Hymn of the Prophet Simaîl
Qewlê Sincaqa
Qewlê Sindrûk
Qewlê Sinî Berî – The Hymn of Sinî Berî. Attributed to Sinî Berî. Has its own melody.
Qewlê Stiya Ês
Qewlê Sultan Êzîd (Qewlê Êzîd)
Qewlê Sura – The Hymn of Mysteries
Qewlê Şeq(e) Serî – The Hymn of Proper Conduct. Attributed to Sheikh Fexir. Sometimes considered to be one of the Berane Qewls.
Qewlê Şerfedîn – The Hymn of Şerfedîn. Attributed to Pîr Reşê Heyran. Has its own melody.
Qewlê Şêxadî û Mêra – The Hymn of Sheikh ʿAdî and Holy Men. Attributed to Pisê Cem. One of the Berane Qewls.
Qewlê Şêx Îsn – The Hymn of Sheikh Îsn
Qewlê Şêxisin û Şêx Fexir
Qewlê Şêşims – The Hymn of Sheikh Şêms. Attributed to Sheikh Fexir. Has its own melody. One of the Berane Qewls.
Qewlê Şêşimsê Tewrêzî – The Hymn of Sheikh Shems of Tabriz
Qewlê Şêx ʿErebegî ʿIntûzî – The Hymn of Sheikh Erebeg from Entush. Attributed to Sheikh Fexir.
Qewlê Şêxê Hesenê Siltan e (Qewlê Borê-borê) – The Hymn of Sheikh Hesen is the Sultan. Attributed to Sheikh Fexir. Has its own melody. Recited at funerals. One of the Berane Qewls.
Qewlê Şêxê Sirî
Qewlê Şêx Fexrê Zergûn – The Hymn of Sheikh Fexir, the Golden [One]. Attributed to Sheikh Fexir.
Qewlê Şêx Hadî – The Hymn of Sheikh Hadî
Qewlê Şêxê Mend û Gêla
Qewlê Şêx Mend û Şêx Reş – The Hymn of Sheikh Mend and Sheikh Reş
Qewlê Şêx Silêm – The Hymn of Sheikh Silêm
Qewlê Şêx û Aqûb (Qewlê Aqûb û Mûsa) – The Hymn of Sheikh and Jacob. Attributed to Sheikh Fexir.
Qewlê Şêxûbekir – The Hymn of Şêxûbekir (Obekr). Attributed to Pîr Reşê Heyran. Has its own melody (similar to Qewlê Xudanê Malê). One of the Berane Qewls.
Qewlê Şirûra – The Hymn of the Wars
Qewlê Şîrê Rastiyê (Qewlê Şûrê Rastiyê) – The Hymn of the Sword of the Truth
Qewlê Şîxisin
Qewlê Tawûsî Melek – The Hymn of Tawûsî Melek
Qewlê Temediya Şîxadî
Qewlê Tercal (Qewlê Tircalî, Qewlê Qiyametê) – The Hymn of the False Saviour
Qewlê Texta – The Hymn of Thrones. Attributed to Sheikh Fexir. Has its own melody.
Qewlê Ûsivê Nebiya
Qewlê Xafilê Bênasîn – The Hymn of the Unknown Negligence
Qewlê Xan Qubad – The Hymn of Xan Qubad
Qewlê Xerqe – The Hymn of the Xerqe. Attributed to Lawikê Pîr.
Qewlê Xewrê – The Hymn of Xewrê
Qewlê Xilmetê – The Hymn of the Service. Attributed to Sheikh Fexir.
Qewlê Xudanê Malê – The Hymn of the Protector of the House. Has its own melody (same as Qewlê Îmanê Bi Çi Nîşan e). Recited at funerals.
Qewlê Yazîd ibn Mavî
Qewlê Zebûnî Meksûr – The Hymn of the Weak Broken One. Attributed to Sheikh Fexir. One of the Berane Qewls.
Qewlê Zerdeşt
Qewlê Zênare

Beyt

Beyta Beharê
Beyta Beʿza
Beyta Bilbila
Beyta Bilbil Miskîno
Beyta Cindî — The Beyt of the Commoner
Beyta Çarşemê
Beyta Derwêş Adem 1
Beyta Derwêş Adem 2
Beyta Dinê
Beyta Dirozga Şêşims — The Dirozge of Sheikh Şems
Beyta ʿElî Şêrê Xwedê
Beyta Eyûbê Kirmaxwarî (Beyta Eyûb Pêxember)
Beyta Feqîrê Teyra
Beyta Gilaviyê
Beyta Hesenê Cêlê
Beyta Heyî Malê — The Beyt of ‘O Home’
Beyta Êvarî (Beyta Hêvarî: Hêvare dest)
Beyta îbrahîmê Bira
Beyta Kemkemir
Beyta Mezînê
Beyta Mihemed û Şeʿrê
Beyta Mirinê
Beyta Miskîn
Beyta Mîr Mihê
Beyta Mûsa Pêxember
Beyta Nesîheta
Beyta Neviyê Ometê (Beyta Mirina Nevîê Ometê)
Beyta Nisira
Beyta Pîrê Libnana
Beyta Pîr Mendî Gor
Beyta Reʿbiyê (Beyta Rebiʿe il-ʿEdewiye)
Beyta Serafiya Hindiya
Beyta Sêwena Kesik
Beyta Sibê (Beyta Şêşims, Beyta Têşta) — The Beyt of the Morning or The Beyt of Sheikh Shems
Beyta Silêman Pêxember û Bûm
Beyta Silêman Pîrê Esmaleka
Beyta Şeʿrê
Beyta Şêşims — The Beyt of Sheikh Şems or the Beyt of the Morning
Beyta Şêwra
Beyta Şêxadî (Şêx Hadî)
Beyta Şêxê Sen’an
Beyta Şêxisin
Beyta Şêx Mend Gêlê
Beyta Şêxû Pîra — The Beyt of Sheikhs and Pirs
Beyta Şîxalê Şemsa
Jandila Mendo

Duʿa

Duʿa
Duʿa Bawiriyê – Prayer of Belief
Duʿa Biskê – Prayer of the Lock of Hair. Recited during the initiation ceremony of bisk birîn, during which the Sheikh of the Lock (Şêxê Biskê) is invited to a house, and a boy's small lock of hair is cut.
Duʿa Bona Xwedê
Duʿa Çevşûştinê
Duʿa Dewrêşê ʿErd – Prayer of the Dewrêş of the Earth
Duʿa Dûpiştkê (Duʿaya Dûpişk û Mar) – Prayer [against the poison] of the scorpion and the snake
Duʿa Êşa Mekanî Jinê – Prayer [against] the pain of the women's uterus
Duʿa Êvarê (Duʿaya Hêvarî) – Evening Prayer
Duʿa Êzdiyatiyê – Prayer of Yezidism
Duʿa Fecrê (Duʿaya Şebeqê)
Duʿa Gêrgêratkê
Duʿa Heqîqetê
Duʿa Heyvê (Duʿa Hîvê)
Duʿa îmanê
Duʿa Kêma Heyvê – Prayer of the Waning Moon
Duʿaya li Mala Mîra
Duʿaya li Ser Giyanê Mirî
Duʿa Mehrê (Duʿa Meʿrbirînê, Diroza Zewacê) – Prayer of the Act of Marriage
Duʿa Meʿrîfetê
Duʿa Mirazê
Duʿa Mirîdiyê – Prayer of Mirîds
Duʿa Mirîşûştinê
Duʿa Morkirinê
Duʿa Nezerê
Duʿa Newqandina Mîzê
Duʿa Nîvro
Duʿa Oxirê – Prayer of the Fortunate. Recited before a long journey.
Duʿa Piştgirêdanê
Duʿa Pîraniyê – Prayer of Pîrs
Duʿa Razanê
Duʿa Rojhilatê
Duʿa Sebrê
Duʿa Serêşê
Duʿa Sibê (Duʿaya Sipêdeyî, Duʿaya Sibeykê) – Morning Prayer
Duʿa Sifrê – Prayer of the Meal
Duʿa Stêra Demilqapê – Prayer of the Morning Star
Duʿa Şebeqê
Duʿa Şerîeʿtê
Duʿa Şêxîtiyê
Duʿa Tawûsî Melek
Duʿa Tawûsî Melek
Duʿa Temametiya Şîxadî
Duʿa Tesmîlî ʿErd
Duʿa Tifaqê – Prayer of Agreement
Duʿa Tokê
Duʿa Xerqe – Prayer of Xerqe
Duʿa Xêrê
Duʿa Xundanê Malê
Duʿa Ziyaretbûnê – Prayer of Pilgrimage
Duʿa Xûdê
Nivêja Miriyan
Nivêja Rojhelatê
Paşnivêj
Temediya Şîxadî
Terqîna "Ferzê Biratiyê"
"The main Yazidi prayer" (by Yegiazarov 1891)
Dirozge (an important prayer with a long litany of important saints and historical figures)
Şedetiya Dîn ("The Declaration of the Faith") (recited before going to sleep)
Terqîn (Telqîn) (recited at funerals and animal sacrifices)

Qesîde

Qesîdên Pîranî
Qesîdes of the Pîrs:

Qesîda Alû Bekir
Qesîda Êk Siwar
Qesîda Hacyal(î)
Qesîda Hecî ʿElî
Qesîda Hesil Meman (Hesin Meman) — The Qesîde of Hesen Meman
Qesîda Hesnaleka
Qesîda Îsîbiya
Qesîda Mehmed Reşan — The Qesîde of Mehmed Reshan
Qesîda Mehmedî Reben
Qesîda Memê Şivan
Qesîda Pîrê Cerwa
Qesîda Pîrî Kemal
Qesîda Pîr Mihemed – Pîr Afat – Xetî Pisî
Qesîda Qedî Bilban
Qesîda Sinî Behrî

Qesîdên Şêxanî
Qesîdes of the Sheikhs:

Qesîda Adiya Şêxê Mine — “Adi is my Sheikh”
Qesîda Amadîn
Qesîda Nasirdîn
Qesîda Sicadîn
Qesîda Şerfedîn — The Qesîde of Sherfedin
Qesîda Şêşims û Melik Fexredîn — The Qesîde of Sheikh Shems and Melik Fekhredin
Qesîda Şêşimsê Tewrêzî
Qesîda Şêx ʿAdî
Qesîda Şêx Alê Şemsa
Qesîda Şêx Babik
Qesîda Şêx Cencer
Qesîda Şêx ʿEbdil Qadir
Qesîda Şêx Mend
Qesîda Şêx Sin — The Qesîde of Sheikh Sin
Qesîda Şêx û Bekir
Qesîda Xatûna Fexra

Other Qesîdes
Qesîda Çopan
Qesîda Kes netê
Qesîda Nadîmî
Qesîda Sibhan e ji te Melkê Ekber
Qesîda Tawûsî Melek

Semaʿ
Semaʿya Bilind
Semaʿya Maka Êz(î)
Semaʿya Merkeba (Semaʿ Miriya)
Semaʿya Qanûnî
Semaʿya Şerfedîn û Şêx Hesen
Semaʿya Şêşims
Semaʿya Zerza(yî)

Other poetic texts
Lavij (Dîroka Lavijê Pîrê)
Xizêmok – Song of the Xizêm ("Nose-Ring") of the Beloved
Payîzok – Autumn Song
Robarîn – Song of the Rivers
Xerîbo

Prose texts

Mishabet
Mishabet texts are sermons:

Derwêşê Baçarê Besrayê
Divê mirovê êzdi çawa be
Li Ser Derwêşiyê û Dilê Paqij
Medh û Sena ji Şîxadî da
Mirin û Axiret
Mishabet û Şiret
Nijandina Adem
Pesna Şerfedîn
Şiret û Karê Baş

Çîrok û Çîvanok
Çîrok and Çîvanok texts are stories or narratives:

Çîroka Birahîm Xelîl (û Nemrûd)
Çîvanoka Hezretî Seîd Fesil (Fezl)
Çîroka Miskîn Tajdîn
Çîroka Nebû Xed Nesir û Qewlê Êzîd û Medehê
Çîroka Peydabûna Sura Êzî — The Story of the Appearance of the Mystery of Ezi
Çîroka Pîr Alî û Batizmî
Çîroka Pîr Mendî Gor — The Story of Pir Mend of the Grave
Çîvanoka Pîr Şerefê Mêravê û Sultan Şêx Mus
(Qewl û) Çîroka Qedî Bilban
Çîroka Silêman Pêxember û Bilqîzê
Çîroka Şîxadî û Siltan Zeng, Bedredîn û Şêx Hesen û Şêx Mend — The Story of Sheikh Adi and the Zangid Sultan, Bedredin, Sheikh Hesen and Sheikh Mend
Çîroka Şêx Fexr û Aqûbê Mûsa
Çîrok û Beyta Şêxê Sen’an

Dastan
Dastan texts are tales:

Dastana Aşiq Xerîb û Şah Senem
Dastana Gêla Mîr Etles
Dastana Mîr Mih
Dastan (û Beyta) Mîr Mihê — The Tale and Beyt of Mir Mih

Texts translated into English
This section lists Yazidi oral religious texts that have been translated into English.

Omarkhali (2017)
Some representative samples of Yazidi oral religious poetry transcribed and compiled by Khanna Omarkhali (2017) include the following.

Qewlê Padişa — The Hymn of the Lord
Qewlê Zebûnî Meksûr — The Hymn of the Weak Broken One
Qewlê Pişt Perde — The Hymn ‘Behind the Veil’
Beyta Heyî Malê — The Beyt of ‘O Home’
Beyta Şêşims or Beyta Sibê — The Beyt of Sheikh Şems or the Beyt of the Morning
Dirozga Şêxşims — The Dirozge of Sheikh Şems
Şehdetiya Dîn — The Declaration of the Faith
Duʿayê Dewrêşê ʿErd — The Prayer to the Dewrêş of the Earth
Duʿa Çevşûştinê — The Prayer of Washing One’s Face
Duʿa Hîvê — The Prayer of the Moon
Duʿaya Tawûsî Melek — The Prayer of Tawûsî Melek
Qesîda Pîrê Kemal — The Qesîde of Pîr Kemal
Qesîda Şêx Babik — The Qesîde of Sheikh Babik

Kreyenbroek (2005)
Yazidi literature compiled by Philip G. Kreyenbroek (2005):

Creation and early history of the world
Qewlê Zebûnî Meksûr — The Hymn of the Weak Broken One
Qewlê Afirîna Dinyayê — The Hymn of the Creation of the World
Qewlê Bê Elîf — The Hymn of B and A
Qewlê Hezar û Yek Nav — The Hymn of the Thousand and One Names
Qewlê Îmanê — The Hymn of the Faith
Qewlê Qendîla — The Hymn of the Lights
Qewlê Qere Ferqan — The Hymn of the Black Furqan
Dûʿa Bawiriyê — The Prayer of Belief
Dûʿa Ziyaretbûn — The Prayer of Pilgrimage
Dûʿa Tifaqê — The Prayer of Agreement
Early history of the faith and community
Çîroka Siltanî Zeng û Şîxadî, Bedredîn û Şêx Hesenû Şêx Mend — The Story of the Zangid Sultan and Sheikh Adi, Bedredin, Sheikh Hesen and Sheikh Mend
Qewlê Pîr Dawud — The Hymn of Pir Dawud
Çîroka Pêdabûna Sura Êzî — The Story of the Appearance of the Mystery of Ezi
Qewlê Mezin — The Great Hymn
Qewlê Mela Abû Bekir — The Hymn of Mullah Abu Bekir
Qewlê Şêxadî û Mêra — The Hymn of Sheikh Adi and the Holy Men
Stories about holy figures
Qewlê Êzdîne Mîr — The Hymn of Ezdina Mir
Çîroka Pîr Mendî Gor — The Story of Pir Mend of the Grave
Qewlê Rabiʿe il-ʿEdewiye — The Hymn of Rabiʿa al-ʿAdawiyya
Duʿa û Qewlê Şêşims — The Prayer and Hymn to Sheikh Shems
Beyta Sibê yan Beyta Şêşims — The Beyt of the Morning or The Beyt of Sheikh Shems
Bêta Şêx û Pîra — The Beyt of Sheikhs and Pirs
Adiye Şêxê Mine — “Adi is my Sheikh”
Qesîda Şêşims û Melik Fexredîn — The Qesîde of Sheikh Shems and Melik Fekhredin
Qesîda Şêx Sin — The Qesîde of Sheikh Sin
Qesîda Şerfedîn — The Qesîde of Sherfedin
Qesîda Hesin Meman — The Qesîde of Hesen Meman
Qesîda Mehmed Reşan — The Qesîde of Mehmed Reshan
Stories deriving from the Islamic or Judaeo-Christian tradition
Çîroka Birahîm Xelîl ligel Qewlê Birahîm Xelîl û Nemrûdû Qewlê Nebî Ismaîl — The Tale of Ibrahim the Friend including the Hymn of Ibrahim the Friend and Nemrud and the Hymn of Ismail
Beyta Bilbila — The Beyt of Nightingales
Religious life and symbols
Misbabet: Derwêşê Bacarê Besrayê — Mishabet: The dervish of the city of Basra
Dûʿa Mirazê — The Prayer of Wishes
Diroze
Moralistic texts, proper behaviour
Mishabet û Şîret — Sermon and Exhortation
Qewlê Mirîdiyê — The Hymn of the Mirids
Qewlê Şeqeserî — The Hymn of Proper Conduct
Beyta Nesîheta — The Beyt of Advice
Death, grief and consolation
Dastan û Beyta Mîr Mihê — The Tale and Beyt of Mir Mih
Qewlê Seremergê — The Hymn of the Moment of Death
Qewlê Cumcumî Siltan — The Hymn of the Sultan’s Skull
Qewlê Şêxê Hesenî Siltane — The Hymn of Sheikh Hesen the Sultan
Qewlê Mûsa — The Hymn of Moses
End of times
Qewlê Tercal — The Hymn of the False Saviour
Qewlê Şerfedîn — The Hymn of Sherfedin
Mystical themes
Qewlê Babekê Omera — The Hymn of Babeke Omera
Qewlê Aşê Mihbetê — The Hymn of the Mill of Love
Other themes
Qewlê ʿErd û ʿEzman — The Hymn of Earth and Sky
Qewlê Keniya Mara — The Hymn of the Laughter of Snakes
Xizêmok
Payîzok
Robarîn

Kreyenbroek (1995)
Philip G. Kreyenbroek (1995) includes the following Yazidi texts:

Qewlê Zebûnî Meksûr — The Hymn of the Weak Broken One
Qewlê Afirîna Dinyayê — The Hymn of the Creation of the World
Qewlê Îmanê — The Hymn of the Faith
Qewlê Behra — The Hymn of the Oceans (not in Kreyenbroek 2005)
Qewlê Şêxûbekir — The Hymn of Sheykh Obekr (not in Kreyenbroek 2005)
Du‘aya Sibeykê — The Morning Prayer (not in Kreyenbroek 2005)
Du‘aya Hêvarî — The Evening Prayer (not in Kreyenbroek 2005)
Şehda Dînî — The Declaration of Faith
Beyta Cindî — The Song of the Commoner (not in Kreyenbroek 2005)
Qewlê Ṭawûsî Melek — The Hymn Of Melek Tawus
Qewlê Melek Şêx Sin — The Hymn of Melek Sheykh Hesen (not in Kreyenbroek 2005)
Qewlê Şêşimsê Tewrêzî — The Hymn of Sheykh Shems of Tabriz (not in Kreyenbroek 2005)
Qewlê Pîr Şeref — The Hymn of Pîr Sheref (not in Kreyenbroek 2005)
Qewlê Şêx ‘Erebegê Entûşî — The Hymn of Sheykh Erebeg Entûsh (not in Kreyenbroek 2005)
Qewlê Pîr Dawûd — The Hymn of Pîr Dawûd
Qewlê Şêxadî û Mêra — The Hymn of Sheykh Adi and the Holy Men
Qewlê Qiyametê — The Hymn of the Resurrection (not in Kreyenbroek 2005)
Qewlê Miskîno Jaro — The Hymn of the Poor Miserable One (not in Kreyenbroek 2005)
Qewlê Seremergê — The Hymn of the Moment of Death

See also
Kurdish literature
Qasida
Dastan
Dua
Yazidi social organization

References

Kurdish literature
 
Literature by ethnicity
Yazidi religion
Religious bibliographies